The 2016–17 Vermont Catamounts men's basketball team represented the University of Vermont during the 2016–17 NCAA Division I men's basketball season. The Catamounts, led by sixth-year head coach John Becker, played their home games at Patrick Gym in Burlington, Vermont and were members of the America East Conference. They finished the season 29–6, 16–0 in America East play to win the America East regular season championship. In the America East tournament, they defeated Maine, New Hampshire and Albany to win the tournament championship. As a result, they received the conference's automatic bid to the NCAA tournament. As a No. 13 seed in the Midwest region, they lost to No. 4-seeded Purdue in the first round.

Previous season
The Catamounts finished the 2015–16 season 23–14, 11–5 in America East play to finish in a tie for third place. They defeated Maine and New Hampshire to advance to the championship game of the America East tournament where they lost to Stony Brook. They received an invitation to the College Basketball Invitational. There, they defeated Western Carolina and Seattle to advance to the semifinals before losing to Nevada.

Preseason 
Vermont was picked to finish first in the preseason America East poll. Trae Bell-Haynes was selected to the preseason All-America East team.

Departures

Incoming Transfers

2016 incoming recruits

Roster

Schedule and results

|-
!colspan=9 style=| Exhibition

|-
!colspan=9 style=| Non-conference regular season

|-
!colspan=9 style=| America East regular season

|-
!colspan=9 style=| America East tournament

|-
!colspan=9 style=| NCAA tournament

References

Vermont Catamounts men's basketball seasons
Vermont
Vermont Catamounts men's b
Vermont
Cat